Windermere is the largest natural lake in England. It is also a name used in a number of places, including:

Australia
 Windermere, New South Wales
 Windermere, Queensland, a locality in the Bundaberg Region
 Windermere, Ascot, a heritage-listed villa in Brisbane, Queensland
 Electoral division of Windermere, Tasmania
 Windermere, Tasmania, a locality in the City of Launceston, Tasmania
 Windermere, Jervis Bay Territory, largest lake in Jervis Bay Territory

The Bahamas
 Windermere Island, a small island connected to Eleuthera in The Bahamas

Canada
 Windermere, British Columbia
 Windermere Lake (British Columbia), a lake in southeast British Columbia
 Windermere Lake (Ontario), a lake in Ontario
 Windermere, Ontario
 Windermere, Edmonton (area), a residential area in Edmonton, Alberta
 Windermere, Edmonton, a neighbourhood within this area
 Windermere group, a group of Proterozoic sedimentary rocks in British Columbia

New Zealand
 Windermere, New Zealand, locality near Hinds

United Kingdom
 Windermere, Cumbria, the largest lake in England 
 Windermere, Cumbria (town), a town near the lake
 Windermere railway station, in the town of Windermere
 Windermere Supergroup, the geological formations of the Windermere region of the English Lake District
 Windermere, South Kenton, a pub in London

United States
 Settlements

 Windermere, Florida
 Windermere (Moultonborough, New Hampshire)
 Windermere, a subdivision that is a part of Morningside Place, Houston, Texas
 Windermere, Seattle, Washington
 Lakes
 Lake Windermere (Illinois), reservoir, Coles County, Illinois, United States 
 Lake Windermere (North Carolina), reservoir, Mecklenburg County, North Carolina, United States 
 Lake Windermere (Tennessee), reservoir, Shelby County, Tennessee, United States

Other uses
 Lady Windermere's Fan, a play by Oscar Wilde
 Windermere Real Estate, a Pacific Northwest real estate company
 SOV Windermere, a subsea operations vessel built in 2010
 Windermere (submarine), a tourist submarine that briefly operated on the Cumbrian lake